Gunfleet Sands Offshore Wind Farm is a 172 MW wind farm about  off the Clacton-on-Sea coast in the Northern Thames Estuary.

The 108 MW Gunfleet Sands 1 wind farm gained planning consent in 2003/4; in 2006 DONG Energy (now Ørsted) acquired the project and submitted an application for a second 64 MW windfarm Gunfleet Sands 2 adjacent to the first, which received consent in 2008. Construction of both mounting Siemens Wind Power SWT-3.6-107 turbines took place between 2008 and 2010.

In 2010 planning began on a demonstration project Gunfleet Sands 3, used to test Siemens' 6 MW wind turbine model; two such turbines were installed in 2013.

Gunfleet Sands 1 & 2

The turbines connect to a 33 kV offshore substation, which steps up the transmission voltage to 132 kV; the export cable makes landfall at Holland Haven (next to Holland-on-Sea), and underground cables connect it to the National Grid at the Cooks Green substation.

Development
Such development near Clacton-on-Sea began in 1996 under Windmaster Developments; Windmaster was acquired by Enron in 2000, and passed to General Electric (GE Wind Energy) in 2002. A Round 1 concession for the development was awarded in 2001, and planning consents obtained in 2003/4.

In June 2006 a consent application and environmental statement was submitted to the Department of Trade and Industry for permission to build and operate an extension (Gunfleet Sands 2) to the consented project: up to 22 further turbines with an additional capacity of 64 MW. In December 2006 DONG Energy acquired the 100-megawatt "Gunfleet 1" project from GE.

A contract for 30 Siemens Wind Power 3.6 MW turbines was signed in April 2007.

The application for Gunfleet Sands 2 rested with decision maker the Department for Business Enterprise and Regulatory Reform in June 2007, who gave its permission the next year.

Construction

Construction began in 2008, with initial work including onshore infrastructure and cable installation. A formal groundbreaking ceremony was held in April 2008. The first turbine was installed in April 2009.

MT Højgaard was contracted to instal the monopile foundations; work started in October 2008; Sif supplied the monopiles and transition pieces, and Smulders supplied the wind turbine foundations,

The cabling was supplied by Prysmian, Bladt Industries constructed the offshore monopile substation superstructure, with electrical equipment supplied by Areva T&D and ABB Group.

Construction of the wind farm was delayed, due to cable layer Oceanteam going into administration in May 2009 and the breakdown of liftboat KS Titan 2.

Electrical generation began in August 2009. The wind farm was fully operational by March 2010; the wind farm was formally opened on 15 June 2010 by Anders Eldrup (DONG Energy) and the UK's Energy Minister Charles Hendry. Cost of the development was 4 billion Danish Kroner. Large-scale development of British wind farms was enabled by their kickstart subsidies: set in 2010 at a long term rate of 1.20 Danish Kroner per kWh, compared to about 0.50 Kroner (Horns Rev 2) in Denmark.

An operations and servicing center was built in Brightlingsea, Essex where a former boatyard stood.

Operational history
The wind farm produced between 450 and 520 GWh between 2010 and 2012, with a capacity factor of 31–35% (2011/12). Its levelised cost has been put at £122 per MWh.

The transmission assets were divested in July 2011 to TC Gunfleet Sands OFTO Limited due to regulatory change. 

In September 2011 Marubeni Corporation acquired a 49.9% shareholding of the farm for £200 million. In 2013 Marubeni divested part of its stake to the Development Bank of Japan.

Gunfleet Sands 3

Ambit
A planning application for the Gunfleet Sands 3 - Demonstration Project (GFS 3) was submitted in 2010. The project consisted of a wind farm about  8.5 km southeast of Clacton. It was for testing new wind farm equipment ready for the Round 3 wind farm letting process. Two wind turbine installations were proposed.

The development required a separate export cable and grid connection to the prior farm; a planning application for the onshore electrical facilities and cabling was submitted in November 2011.

Suppliers
Inter-array and export cables (at 33 kV) were supplied by JDR Cables.

The monopile foundations and transition pieces were supplied by Bladt Industries and installed by Ballast Nedam in 2012. Two Siemens 6MW turbines were installed in January 2013 by A2SEA.

Productivity
The site began generating power in April 2013. A blade replacement took place in mid 2013 after one of the tips was damaged. The facility was officially opened on 12 September 2013 by UK Energy Minister Greg Barker.

See also

Wind power in the United Kingdom
List of offshore wind farms in the United Kingdom
List of offshore wind farms in the North Sea
List of offshore wind farms

References

Sources

Gunfleet 1 & 2

Gunfleet 3

External links

Thames Estuary
Offshore wind farms in the North Sea
Power stations in the East of England
Wind farms in England
Ørsted (company) wind farms
Round 2 offshore wind farms
Marubeni
2010 establishments in England
Energy infrastructure completed in 2010